Gareth John Maldwyn Edwards (born 13 November 1976) is a former Welsh cricketer.  Edwards was a right-handed batsman who bowled right-arm off break.  He was born in St Asaph, Flintshire.  He studied geography at University College London.

Edwards played a single Youth Test for England Under-19s against Zimbabwe Under-19s on England's tour of Zimbabwe in 1995/96.  Having played in the Glamorgan Second XI since 1994, Edwards made his only first-class appearance for Glamorgan against Oxford University in 1997.  In this match he did not bat in either Glamorgan innings, while with the ball he bowled 9 wicket-less overs.

In 1998, he made 2 Minor Counties Championship appearances for Wales Minor Counties against Shropshire and Cornwall, and a single MCCA Knockout Trophy appearance against Hertfordshire.  Following the end of his cricket career, he moved to Manchester where he worked for the BBC as a researcher for A Question of Sport.

References

External links
Gareth Edwards at ESPNcricinfo
Gareth Edwards at CricketArchive

1976 births
Living people
Sportspeople from St Asaph
Alumni of University College London
Welsh cricketers
Glamorgan cricketers
Wales National County cricketers
BBC people